is a railway station in the town of Kawazu, Shizuoka Prefecture, Japan, operated by the privately owned Izu Kyūkō Line .

Lines

Station layout
The station has one side platform sandwiched between two tunnels. The platform length is equivalent in length to eight train cars access to trains is limited only to the middle seven cars. The station building is a log cabin style building, using wood from the surrounding forests.

Adjacent stations

History 
Imaihama-Kaigan Station was opened on December 10, 1961, initially as a temporary stop only open during the summer months due to its proximity to nearby swimming beaches. It became a permanent station on March 1, 1969. A new station building was completed in July 2006.

Passenger statistics
In fiscal 2017, the station was used by an average of 132 passengers daily (boarding passengers only).

Surrounding area
Japan National Route 135
Imaihama onsen

See also
 List of Railway Stations in Japan

References

External links

official home page.

Railway stations in Shizuoka Prefecture
Izu Kyūkō Line
Railway stations in Japan opened in 1961
Stations of Izu Kyūkō
Kawazu, Shizuoka